The 8th Dáil was elected at the 1933 general election on 24 January 1933 and met on 8 February 1933. The members of Dáil Éireann, the house of representatives of the Oireachtas (legislature) of the Irish Free State, are known as TDs. From 29 May 1936, it was the sole house of the Oireachtas, after the disbandment of Seanad Éireann. The 8th Dáil was dissolved on 14 June 1937. The 8th Dáil lasted  days.

Composition of the 8th Dáil

Fianna Fáil, denoted with a bullet, formed the 7th Executive Council of the Irish Free State.

Graphical representation
This is a graphical comparison of party strengths in the 8th Dáil from February 1933. This was not the official seating plan.

Ceann Comhairle
On 8 February 1933, Frank Fahy (FF), who had served as Ceann Comhairle in the previous Dáil, was proposed by Éamon de Valera and seconded by William Norton for the position, and was elected without a vote.

TDs by constituency
The list of the 153 TDs elected, is given in alphabetical order by Dáil constituency.

Changes

Footnotes

References

External links
Houses of the Oireachtas: Debates: 8th Dáil

 
08
8th Dáil